Pavel Vladimirovich Kondrakhin (born 27 April 1994) is a former Russian football player who played as a forward.

Career
He made his professional debut in the Russian Professional Football League for FC TSK Simferopol on 20 August 2014 in a game against FC SKChF Sevastopol.

After playing for several years in the Russian and Armenian leagues, Kondrakhin signed for Tulsa Roughnecks of the United Soccer League on March 3, 2017.

Kondrakhin has a United States passport, thus he counted as a domestic player as per United Soccer League roster restrictions.

References

External links
 Career summary by sportbox.ru
 

1994 births
Footballers from Moscow
Living people
Russian footballers
Association football forwards
FC Dynamo Bryansk players
Ulisses FC players
FC Tulsa players
Russian expatriate footballers
Expatriate footballers in Armenia
Armenian Premier League players
USL Championship players